Michele Lessona (20 September 1823, Venaria Reale, Piedmont – 20 July 1894, Turin) was an Italian zoologist.

Michele Lessona became a specialist in amphibians. His accomplishments include the translation of certain works of Darwin, for example, The Descent of Man, and Selection in Relation to Sex.

Biography
Lessona studied medicine in Turin, afterwards relocating to Egypt, where he worked in a hospital outside of Cairo as hospital director at Karnak. From 1850 he studied natural sciences at Turin, and in the meantime found employment as a secondary school teacher. In 1854 he attained the chair of mineralogy and zoology at the University of Genoa.

In 1862, with Filippo de Filippi, he took part in a scientific and diplomatic mission to Persia, and after his return to Italy, he was named chair of zoology at the University of Bologna in 1863. In 1867 he became chair of zoology and comparative anatomy at the University of Turin. He was the first to translate Darwin's The Descent of Man into Italian, in 1871. He was also a Senator of the Kingdom from 1877 to 1894.

Eponyms
Lessona has several herpetological species named after him, such as Pelophylax lessonae, Diploglossus lessonae, and Trapelus lessonae.

Works
Partial list
 , 1869. Florence.
 Carlo Darwin. 1883. Reissued by Kessinger, 2009, .
 Venti anni fa 1884. Reissued by Kessinger, 2009, .
 Le cacce in Persia. 1884. Rome. Reissued by Kessinger, 2010, .

References

External links
 
 
 Google Books The Eponym Dictionary of Reptiles by Bo Beolens, Michael Watkins, Michael Grayson.
 torinoscienza In Italian
 WorldCat Identities (list of published works)

1823 births
1894 deaths
People from Venaria Reale
Italian zoologists
Academic staff of the University of Bologna
Academic staff of the University of Turin
Academic staff of the University of Genoa
Italian herpetologists